Muravinka is a rural locality (a village) in Zlynkovsky District, Bryansk Oblast, Russia. The population was 5 as of 2013. There are 3 streets.

Geography 
Muravinka is located 9 km northeast of Zlynka (the district's administrative centre) by road. Guta is the nearest rural locality.

References 

Rural localities in Zlynkovsky District